

Newington Causeway is a road in Southwark, London, between the Elephant and Castle and Borough High Street. Elephant & Castle Underground station is at the southern end. It follows the route of the old Roman road Stane Street.

In 1912, an outpatients' department of the South London Hospital for Women and Children was opened in Newington Causeway, using money raised by Harriet Shaw Weaver, publisher of The Freewoman, and other feminists.

Metro Central Heights (originally known as Alexander Fleming House) -- an early 1960s series of multi-storey blocks designed by Ernő Goldfinger as office buildings subsequently converted into flats—stands at the southern end of the road. The Ministry of Sound, a famous nightclub, is in Gaunt Street just off Newington Causeway. This is also where the Inner London Sessions House, a Crown Court, and the Newington Court Business Centre are located.

The Institute of Optometry, formerly the London Refraction Hospital, is at 56–62 Newington Causeway.
The Salvation Army UK and Republic of Ireland headquarters occupy a large building at 101 Newington Causeway.

The road forms part of the A3.

Major adjoining roads and streets 
 Borough High Street
 Borough Road
 Elephant and Castle roundabout
 Gaunt Street
 Harper Road
 Southwark Bridge Road

See also 
 Newington, London

References

External links 
 Restaurants and pubs

Streets in the London Borough of Southwark
The Salvation Army